Anthracite Railroads Historical Society, Inc. (ARHS) is a non-profit organization founded in 1974 to preserve historic anthracite hauling railroads of eastern Pennsylvania. The railroads that ARHS is responsible for preserving include:

 Central Railroad of New Jersey (1843–1976)
 Delaware, Lackawanna and Western Railroad (18??-1960)
 Lehigh and Hudson River Railway (18??-1976)
 Lehigh and New England Railroad (1895–1961)
 Lehigh Valley Railroad (1851–1976)
 Reading Company (1833–1976)

Collections
The ARHS owns various pieces of rolling stock either depicting an Anthracite Road or a genuine piece of Anthracite Road history.

Publications
ARHS publishes The Anthracite Extra newsletter and Flags, Diamonds and Statues magazine.

References

Rail transportation in Pennsylvania